The second season of High School Rapper (Hangul: 고등래퍼 2) is a 2018 South Korean survival hip hop TV show. It aired on Mnet starting February 23 to April 13, 2018. Kim Ha-on won, Bae Yeon-seo came in second and Lee Byung-jae placed third in the final ranking.

Season overview

Mentors 
GroovyRoom
Hangzoo x Boi B
San E x Cheetah
Deepflow

Contestants

Episodes

Ep. 1-2: Cypher 
On the first episode of the show, 32 high school students handpicked by the show's producers among 8,000 applicants met each other the first time. Students in the same grade had to compete each other with freestyle rap, and the other grades got to vote on the best rapper among that grade. Then, the students voted first place in their respective grades were given the opportunity to take turns and choose their own teammates.

Ep. 2-3: Team Finalization - Your Personal Story 
Among eight teammates in each team determined from last competition, only top four, decided by the producers after watching their performance with lyrics about their personal stories, were allowed to advance to the next round. Four teams of producers each were allowed to give maximum 50 points to each student, allowing for maximum 200 points per student.

Results for students Kim Eun-ji and Alice weren't disclosed. Afterwards, Deepflow became the team's mentor.

Afterwards, the team chose Hangzoo and Boi B as their mentors.

Afterwards, Groovy Room was chosen as the team's mentors.

Bin Ha-neul's results weren't disclosed. Afterwards, the team chose San E and Cheetah for their mentors.

Ep. 4-5: Team Battle - Textbook Literature 
Students had to choose either a poetry or novel piece of their choice and write a song about it. Each team, consisting of 4 members, were divided into two groups of two, and competed with other groups. For groups that lost, only one of them were allowed to pass and the other one disqualified.

Disqualified: Lee Seung-hwa, Ha Seon-ho, Park Jin-oh, and Lee Ji-eun.

All else passed.

Ep. 5-6: Team Battle - Collaboration with Mentors 
Students competed in two groups, one group where mentors and students performed together, and the other where students performed with the beat produced by their mentors. Students that failed to get in top three were disallowed from advancing to the next round.

Oh Dam-ryul failed to get in the top three.

Lee Ye-chan failed to pass to the next round.

Ep. 7: Semi-Final 
Of 10 students left in the race, only 5 were allowed to advance to the finals, determined by the audience vote after watching everyone's performance.

Ep. 8: Final 
The audience of 500 voted on the students once during each performance, and once after every performance was over. On the first round of voting, cast during the performance, one voter could cast his or her vote to however many students, so every student could earn 500 maximum points. On the second round, cast after the performances, one voter could only vote on one member.

Kim Ha-on became the champion.

Ratings

References

External links 
 (Korean) Official website 

2018 South Korean television seasons